Silstedt is a village in Saxony-Anhalt. It is part of the town Wernigerode.

Geography
Silstedt is located at the northeastern side of Wernigerode. Through Silstedt goes the Landesstraße L82, that goes from Wernigerode to Derenburg. In the Northeast flows the Holtemme.

History
It got first mentioned on 12 November 995 as Silzestedi from Otto III to the Meißen diocese. On 1 April 1993, it was incorporated into Wernigerode.

Demographics

References

Former municipalities in Saxony-Anhalt
Wernigerode